The Stuff Heroes Are Made Of is a 1911 American short silent drama film directed by D. W. Griffith and Frank Powell and starring Blanche Sweet.

Cast
 Edwin August as The Young Author
 Blanche Sweet as Alice
 Marion Sunshine as Jennie
 Jack Pickford

See also
 D. W. Griffith filmography
 Blanche Sweet filmography

References

External links

1911 films
American silent short films
Biograph Company films
American black-and-white films
1911 drama films
Films directed by D. W. Griffith
Films directed by Frank Powell
1911 short films
Silent American drama films
1910s American films